Timoradza is a village and municipality in Bánovce nad Bebravou District in the Trenčín Region of north-western Slovakia.

History
In historical records the village was first mentioned in 1355.

Geography
The municipality lies at an altitude of 235 metres and covers an area of 10.489 km². It has a population of about 507 people.

External links
  Official page
https://web.archive.org/web/20070513023228/http://www.statistics.sk/mosmis/eng/run.html

Villages and municipalities in Bánovce nad Bebravou District